Vinosady ( or ) is a village and municipality in western Slovakia in  Pezinok District in the Bratislava Region, on the foothills of the Little Carpathians.

Names and etymology
The current name means Vineyards and refers to rich vineyard tradition in this region.

The former village Kučišdorf was initially known as Turduna, Torduna, Turna or Thurnie, the name comes from Slovak tŕň, trnava (see also etymology of Trnava).  Its later name Kučišdorf comes from a personal name probably of Slavic origin Kucar/Kučar adopted to the Hungarian language as Chucar, Csukar (Chukarfalva, Csukárd). The name of the second former village Trlinok also comes from Slovak tŕň. In 1948, villages were renamed: Kučišdorf to Veľké Tŕnie and Trlinok to Malé Tŕnie.

History
In historical records the village, which was made of two independent parts was first mentioned in 1208, although it was inhabited lot sooner, in the 9th century, as the Great Moravian site was discovered near the village.

At the end of the 13th century, two village arose: Trlinka and Kučišdorf, which were closely linked to their bigger towns, Pezinok and Modra. The villages merged in 1964 to one village Vinosady. The merged village got its own coat-of-arms in 1998.

Geography
The village lies at an altitude of 179 metres and covers an area of 5.15 km². It has a population of 1049 people. The village is located 26 km from Bratislava and 3 km from Pezinok.

References

External links

Official website 
http://www.statistics.sk/mosmis/eng/run.html

Villages and municipalities in Pezinok District